Mirza Muhammad Ghufran (c. 1857 –  c. 1926) was a prominent courtier, historiographer and poet from Chitral. He was a witness to Chitral's turbulent history in the late 19th century. His compilations on events of the time are considered one of the most authentic and authoritative sources.

References 

1857 births
1926 deaths
Chitrali people
Historiographers
Indian male poets
Indian courtiers